PieLab is a restaurant in Greensboro, Alabama, specializing in pie. The place was opened in an abandoned pool hall in 2009 by a group of designers from Belfast, Maine (calling themselves "Project M"). Led by Amanda Buck, it includes a design studio and culinary school and aims for social change in the community. Their "Empire Apple Pie" was written up by Southern Living for their series "The South's Best Pies", and Food & Wine likewise praised the apple pie, adding that the bakery's profits go toward housing and temporary shelters in Hale County, Alabama. They were one of three finalists for a 2010 James Beard Foundation Award. Food writer John T. Edge discussed PieLab at length in The New York Times, providing a history of Project M as well.

References

External links
Official website

Restaurants in Alabama
Tourist attractions in Hale County, Alabama
Cooking schools in the United States
2009 establishments in Alabama
Restaurants established in 2009
Bakery cafés